João Miguel Fernandes Marçal (born 30 April 1980) is a Portuguese futsal player who is a winger for Jardim da Amoreira and the Portugal national team.

References

External links

1980 births
Living people
People from Lisbon
Portuguese men's futsal players
Sporting CP futsal players
S.L. Benfica futsal players